Heavy Soul is the fourth album by English singer-songwriter Paul Weller, originally released on 23 June 1997 (5 August in the USA). The album received largely favourable reviews. It sold enough to be the number one album on its week of release, however it was denied this position on a technicality – five images within the album's booklet were replaced with postcards of the images in the Special Edition release, meaning that sales of the Special Edition did not count towards the album's sales as they were defined as free gifts.

The title was lifted from a 1961 Ike Quebec album of the same name.

Track listing
All tracks composed by Paul Weller; except where indicated
"Heavy Soul (Pt 1)"
"Peacock Suit"
"Up in Suzes' Room"
"Brushed" (music: Weller, Marco Nelson, Steve White)
"Driving Nowhere"
"I Should Have Been There to Inspire You"
"Heavy Soul (Pt 2)"
"Friday Street"
"Science"
"Golden Sands"
"As You Lean Into the Light"
"Mermaids"

The Japanese edition included a bonus track, "Eye of the Storm" which was originally on the B-side of the "Peacock Suit" single.

Personnel
Paul Weller – guitar, vocals, tamboura (1), zither (3), piano (6), vibraphone (7)
Marco Nelson – bass, sitar (2,7), ukulele (3)
Steve White – drums
with:
Steve Cradock – guitar (1,2)
Brendan Lynch – keyboards (3,5,11), accordion (6)
Jools Holland – Wurlitzer piano (10)
Rosie Wetters – string arrangements, extra vocals (7)
Wired Strings – strings
Technical
Martin "Max" Heyes – engineer
Simon Halfon, Paul Weller – artwork

Charts

Weekly charts

Year-end charts

References

1997 albums
Paul Weller albums
Island Records albums